"A Little Bit Crazy" is a song written and recorded by American country music artist Eddy Raven.  It was released in February 1982 as the third single from the album Desperate Dreams.  The song reached #14 on the Billboard Hot Country Singles & Tracks chart.

Chart performance

References

1982 singles
Eddy Raven songs
Songs written by Eddy Raven
Song recordings produced by Jimmy Bowen
Elektra Records singles
1982 songs